The National Invitation Tournament was originated by the Metropolitan Basketball Writers Association in 1938. Responsibility for its administration was transferred two years later to local colleges, first known as the Metropolitan Intercollegiate Basketball Committee and in 1948, as the Metropolitan Intercollegiate Basketball Association (MIBA), which comprised representatives from five New York City schools: Fordham University, Manhattan College, New York University, St. John's University, and Wagner College. Originally all of the teams qualifying for the tournament were invited to New York City, and all games were played at Madison Square Garden.

The tournament originally consisted of only six teams, which later expanded to eight teams in 1941, 12 teams in 1949, 14 teams in 1965, 16 teams in 1968, 24 teams in 1979, 32 teams in 1980, and 40 teams from 2002 through 2006. In 2007, the tournament reverted to the current 32-team format.

Selected teams
Below is a list of the 14 teams selected for the tournament.

 Army
 Boston College
 Bradley
 Detroit
 Fordham
 La Salle
 Manhattan
 New Mexico
 NYU
 St. John's
 Saint Louis
 Texas Western
 Villanova
 Western Kentucky

Bracket
Below is the tournament bracket.

See also
 1965 NCAA University Division basketball tournament
 1965 NCAA College Division basketball tournament
 1965 NAIA Division I men's basketball tournament

References

National Invitation
National Invitation Tournament
1960s in Manhattan
Basketball in New York City
College sports in New York City
Madison Square Garden
National Invitation Tournament
National Invitation Tournament
Sports competitions in New York City
Sports in Manhattan